The 2019–20 season was Maccabi Tel Aviv's 113th season since its establishment in 1906, and 72nd since the establishment of the State of Israel. During the 2019–20 campaign the club competed in the Israeli Premier League, the State Cup, the Toto Cup, and the UEFA Champions League.

First team

Transfers

In

Summer

Out

Loans in

Loans out

Pre-season and friendlies

UEFA Champions League

Second qualifying round

UEFA Europa League

Third qualifying round

Competition

Israeli Premier League

Regular season table

Regular season

Championship

Super Cup

State Cup

Toto Cup

Squad statistics

Appearances and goals

Top scorers

Assists

Clean sheets

Disciplinary

References

Maccabi Tel Aviv F.C. seasons
Maccabi Tel Aviv